Sultan Firuz Shah Tughlaq (1309 – 20 September 1388) was a Muslim ruler from the Tughlaq dynasty, who reigned over the Sultanate of Delhi from 1351 to 1388. He succeeded his cousin Muhammad bin Tughlaq following the latter's death at Thatta in Sindh, where Muhammad bin Tughlaq had gone in pursuit of Taghi the rebellious Muslim governor of Gujarat. For the first time in the history of Delhi Sultanate, a situation was confronted wherein nobody was ready to accept the reins of power. With much difficulty, the camp followers convinced Firoz to accept the responsibility. In fact, Khwaja Jahan, the Wazir of Muhammad bin Tughlaq had placed a small boy on throne claiming him to the son of Muhammad bin Tughlaq, who meekly surrendered afterwards. Due to widespread unrest, his realm was much smaller than Muhammad's. Tughlaq was forced by rebellions to concede virtual independence to Bengal and other provinces. He established Sharia across his realm.

Background
His father's name was Rajab (the younger brother of Ghazi Malik) who had the title Sipahsalar. His mother Naila was a Bhati Rajput princess (daughter of Rana Mal) from Dipalpur, Punjab.

Rule
We know of Firoz Shah Tughlaq in part through his 32-page autobiography, titled Futuhat-e-firozshahi. He was 42 when he became Sultan of Delhi in 1351. He ruled until 1388. At his succession, after the death of Muhammad Tughlaq, he faced many rebellions, including in Bengal, Gujarat and Warangal. Nonetheless he worked to improve the infrastructure of the empire building canals, rest-houses and hospitals, creating and refurbishing reservoirs and digging wells. He founded several cities around Delhi, including Jaunpur, Firozpur, Hissar, Firozabad, Fatehabad. Most of Firozabad was destroyed as subsequent rulers dismantled its buildings and reused the spolia as building materials, and the rest was subsumed as New Delhi grew.

Religious and administrative policies
Tughlaq was a fervent Muslim who tried to uphold the laws of Islam and adopted Sharia policies. He made a number of important concessions to theologians. He imposed Jizya tax on all non-Muslims. He tried to ban practices that the orthodox theologians considered un-Islamic, an example being his prohibition of the practice of Muslim women going out to worship at the graves of saints. He persecuted a number of sects which were considered heretical by the Muslim theologians. Tughlaq took to heart the mistakes made during his uncle Muhammad's rule. He decided not to reconquer areas that had broken away, nor to keep further areas from taking their independence. He was indiscriminately benevolent and lenient as a sultan. He decided to keep nobles and the Ulema happy so that they would allow him to rule his kingdom peacefully.

"The southern states had drifted away from the Sultanate and there were rebellions in Gujarat and Sindh", while "Bengal asserted its independence."  He led expeditions to against Bengal in 1353 and 1358.  He captured Cuttack, desecrated the Jagannath Temple, Puri, and forced Raja Gajpati of Jajnagar in Orissa to pay tribute. He converted Chauhan Rajputs from Hinduism to Islam in the 14th century. They are now known as Qaimkhanis in Rajasthan.

He laid siege to Kangra Fort and forced Nagarkot to pay tribute, and did the same with Thatta. During his time Tatar Khan of Greater Khorasan attacked Punjab multiple times and during final battle in Gurdaspur his face was slashed by the sword given by Feroz Shah Tughlaq to Raja Kailash Pal of Mau-Paithan from Nagarkot region. Firuz Shah Tughlaq married off his daughter with Raja Kailash Pal, embraced him to Islam and sent the couple to rule Greater Khorasan, where eleven sons known by the caste of 'badpagey' were born to the queen.

Rather than awarding position based on merit, Tughlaq allowed a noble's son to succeed to his father's position and jagir after his death. The same was done in the army, where an old soldier could send his son, son-in-law or even his slave in his place. He increased the salary of the nobles. He stopped all kinds of harsh punishments such as cutting off hands. He also lowered the land taxes that Muhammad had raised. Tughlaq's reign has been described as the greatest age of corruption in medieval India: He once gave a golden tanka to a distraught soldier so that he could bribe the clerk to pass his sub-standard horse.

Infrastructure and education
Tughlaq instituted economic policies to increase the material welfare of his people. Many rest houses (sarai), gardens and tombs(Tughluq tombs) were built. A number of madrasas (Islamic religious schools) were opened to encourage the religious education of Muslims. He set up hospitals for the free treatment of the poor and encouraged physicians in the development of Unani medicine. He provided money for the marriage of girls belonging to poor families under the department of Diwan-i-khairat. He commissioned many public buildings in Delhi. He built Firoz Shah Palace Complex at Hisar in 1354 CE, over 300 villages and dug five major canals, including the renovation of Prithviraj Chauhan era Western Yamuna Canal, for irrigation bringing more land under cultivation for growing grain and fruit. For day-to-day administration, Sultan Firuz Shah Tughlaq heavily depended on Malik Maqbul, previously commander of Warangal fort, who was captured and converted to Islam. When Tughlaq was away on a campaign to Sind and Gujarat for six months and no news was available about his whereabouts Maqbul ably protected Delhi. He was the most highly favoured among the significant number of the nobles in Tughlaq's court and retained the trust of the sultan. Sultan Firuz Shah Tughlaq used to call Maqbul as 'brother'. The sultan remarked that Khan-i-Jahan (Malik Maqbul) was the real ruler of Delhi.

Hindu religious works were translated from Sanskrit to Persian and Arabic. He had a large personal library of manuscripts in Persian, Arabic and other languages. He brought 2 Ashokan Pillars from Meerut, and Topra near Radaur in Yamunanagar district of Haryana, carefully cut and wrapped in silk, to Delhi in bullock cart trains. He re-erected one of them on the roof of his palace at Firoz Shah Kotla.

Transfer of capital was the highlight of his reign. When the Qutb Minar was struck by lightning in 1368 AD, knocking off its top storey, he replaced them with the existing two floors, faced with red sandstone and white marble. One of his hunting lodges, Shikargah, also known as Kushak Mahal, is situated within the Teen Murti Bhavan complex, Delhi. The nearby Kushak Road is named after it, as is the Tughlaq Road further on.

Legacy
His eldest son, Fateh Khan, died in 1376. He then abdicated in August 1387 and made his other son, Prince Muhammad, king. A slave rebellion forced him to confer the royal title to his grandson, Tughluq Khan.

Tughlaq's death led to a war of succession coupled with nobles rebelling to set up independent states. His lenient attitude had strengthened the nobles, thus weakening the his position. His successor Ghiyas-ud-Din Tughlaq II could not control the slaves or the nobles. The army had become weak and the empire had shrunk in size. Ten years after his death, Timur's invasion devastated Delhi. His tomb is located in Hauz Khas (New Delhi), close to the tank built by Alauddin Khalji. Attached to the tomb is a madrasa built by Firoz Shah in 1352–53.

Coin gallery

References

External links

 The Dargah Qadam Sharif or Shrine of the Holy Foot, Delhi

Tughluq sultans
1309 births
1388 deaths
14th-century Indian Muslims
14th-century Indian monarchs
14th-century Turkic people
14th century in India